Margaret Stratford Livingstone is the Takeda Professor of Neurobiology in the Department of Neurobiology at Harvard Medical School in the field of visual perception. She authored the book Vision and Art: The Biology of Seeing. She was elected a member of the American Academy of Arts and Sciences in 2015  and was elected to the National Academy of Sciences in 2020.

Education and career 
Livingstone was born in Virginia, started college at Duke University and then transferred to Massachusetts Institute of Technology where she received her undergraduate degree in 1972. In 1981 she earned her Ph.D from Harvard University. Following her Ph.D. she worked as a as a visiting fellow at Princeton University and then was a postdoctoral fellow under David H. Hubel at Harvard University. In 1983 she became an assistant professor at Harvard Medical School, and in 1988 she was promoted to professor, and in 2014 she was named the Takeda Professor of Neurobiology.

Research 
Livingstone's early research was on neurons that respond to serotonin, which she conducted by using lobsters as a model organism. She went on to examine the visual responses in cats, monkeys, and how primates sense color. Her research provides insight into how mammals perceive form and movement, the physiological details leading to dsylexia, and the region of the brain used to identify faces.

Livingstone's research using Rhesus monkeys to study human vision is viewed as both necessary and controversial. Her 2022 paper examined how infant monkeys become attached to soft, inanimate objects, research which raised concerns by People for the Ethical Treatment of Animals. Science published an article on October 19, 2022 outlining the controversy and response by Harvard Medical School, as well as the response of Catherine Hobaiter, a primatologist who has advocated for the retraction of Livingstone's publications as well as the termination of her funding and her research at Harvard Medical School. Margaret Livingstone released a personal statement regarding the specifics of the procedures used in her research on October 24, 2022. Harvard Medical School responded to these concerns on October 14, 2022 by stating that all research conducted at Harvard Medical School follows the guidelines set out by the Animal Welfare Act, the Public Health Service on Humane Care and Use of Animals, and AAALAC International.

Selected publications

Awards and honors 
In 2011, the Society for Neuroscience awarded Livingstone the Mika Salpeter Lifetime Achievement Award. In 2015 she was elected to the American Academy of Arts and Sciences, and in 2020 she was elected to the United States' National Academy of Sciences.

References

External links
Margaret Stratford Livingstone SfN Biography (PDF)

Harvard Medical School faculty
Living people
Harvard University alumni
American neuroscientists
American women neuroscientists
Fellows of the American Academy of Arts and Sciences
Members of the United States National Academy of Sciences
Massachusetts Institute of Technology alumni
1950 births
American women academics
21st-century American women